Dima Halam Daogah was an Indian extremist group operating mainly in Assam and Nagaland. The group laid down their arms in January 2013, and claimed to represent the Dimasa and their goal to create a Dimaland or Dimaraji in the two states.

Objective
The Dima Halam Daoga (DHD) is a descendant of the Dimasa National Security Force (DNSF), which ceased operations in 1995. Commander-in-Chief Jewel Gorlosa, refused to surrender and launched the Dima Halam Daogah. After the peace agreement between the DHD and the central government in the year 2003, the group further broke out and DHD(J) also known as Black Widow was born which was led by Jewel Gorlosa. The Black Widow's declared objective is to create Dimaraji for the Dimasa people in Dima Hasao district only. However The objective of DHD (Nunisa faction) is to include parts of Cachar, Karbi Anglong, and Nagaon districts in Assam, and sections of Dimapur district in Nagaland.

Activities
Th DHDs are active mainly in the district of Dima Hasao of Assam. Their presence can be felt in all the territories demanded by them to be included in Dimaraji. Their activities included extortion to fund their movement and a regular volleys and parleys with the representatives of the state government and the central government to fulfill their demands.

Organization
The DHD(J) faction is estimated to have around 400 active cadres while the DHD(N) is estimated to have around 800-1200 active cadres. The chairman of the DHD(N) is Pranab Nunisa who came to power on June 24, 2004, after a takeover which ousted founder Jewel Garlossa. The chairman of the DHD is Dilip Nunisa. Other major figures include Kanta Langthasa, Yathong Dimasa, and Rongsling Dimasa.

The DHD has been linked to many other separatist organizations in India, including the National Democratic Front of Bodoland, NSCN and the ULFA.

India banned the Dima Halam Daogah (DHD)-Black Widow militant group in the wake of its involvement in several incidents of violence in Assam on July 2, 2009.

Surrender in September 2009

The group surrendered en masse to the CRPF and local police, prior to a deadline, with 193 cadres surrendering on 2009-09-12 and another 171 on the 13th. This may include 138 armed cadre of DHD-J. Arms surrendered included 37 AK series assault rifles, ten M-16 rifles, 11 US carbines, two each of Self-Loading Rifles (SLR) and M-21 rifle, one each of Ins as rifle, sten gun, 40-mm gun, Universal Machine Gun (UMG),Rocket Propelling Gun (RPG) and 9-mm pistols. In addition, 7,303 grenades and over 10,000 assorted ammunition were surrendered.

See also
 Insurgency in Northeast India

References

External links
Assam peace conclave to revive ULFA talks Times of India - March 21, 2007
Dimasa terrorists kill 11 in Assam ambush Times of India - October 7, 2006

Rebel groups in India
Terrorism in Assam
Terrorism in India
Organisations designated as terrorist by India